The Orkney football team is the representative football team for the islands of Orkney, Scotland. They are not affiliated with FIFA or UEFA. The team regularly competes in the Island Games and has a strong rivalry with the representative teams of Shetland and Caithness.

This team should not be confused with Orkney F.C. which competes in the North Caledonian League.

Tournament records

Island Games

N.B. In 2019 football was controversially not officially part of the Island Games due to the hosts Gibraltar not having enough pitches. A replacement competition, the ten team 2019 Inter Games Football Tournament, was held in Anglesey, where Orkney finished 8th. They played four matches, winning one and losing three, with an overall goal record of four scored and eleven conceded.

North Atlantic Cup 
Note: 2 points for a win era.

 1 North Atlantic Cup win

Milne Cup 
Including Kirkwall vs. Lerwick

 41 Milne Cup wins

Mitchell and Sutherland Shields

Mitchell Shield

Sutherland Shield 

 1 Sutherland Shield win

Selected Internationals opponents
Last update: November 2008

Managers

  Karl Adamson (2016-)

References

External links
List of matches in Roon Ba

Orkney
Amateur association football in Scotland
Sports teams in Scotland
National football team
Amateur association football teams